Gymnochthebius is a genus of minute moss beetles in the family Hydraenidae. There are more than 60 described species in Gymnochthebius.

Species
These 64 species belong to the genus Gymnochthebius:

 Gymnochthebius angulonotus Perkins, 2005
 Gymnochthebius angustipennis (Deane, 1931)
 Gymnochthebius australis (Blackburn, 1888)
 Gymnochthebius bacchusi Perkins, 2005
 Gymnochthebius bartyrae Perkins, 1980
 Gymnochthebius benesculptus Perkins, 2005
 Gymnochthebius bisagittatus Perkins, 1980
 Gymnochthebius brisbanensis (Blackburn, 1898)
 Gymnochthebius chilenus (Balfour-Browne, 1971)
 Gymnochthebius clandestinus Perkins, 1980
 Gymnochthebius clarki (Deane, 1931)
 Gymnochthebius compactus Perkins, 1980
 Gymnochthebius coruscus Perkins, 2005
 Gymnochthebius crassipes (Sharp, 1882)
 Gymnochthebius curvus Perkins, 1980
 Gymnochthebius falli Perkins
 Gymnochthebius fischeri (Deane, 1931)
 Gymnochthebius fontinalis Perkins, 2005
 Gymnochthebius fossatus (LeConte, 1855)
 Gymnochthebius francki (Bruch, 1915)
 Gymnochthebius fumosus Perkins, 2005
 Gymnochthebius germaini (Zaitzev, 1908)
 Gymnochthebius hesperius Perkins, 2005
 Gymnochthebius inlineatus Perkins, 2005
 Gymnochthebius ischigualasto Perkins & Archangelsky, 2002
 Gymnochthebius jensenhaarupi (Knisch, 1924)
 Gymnochthebius laevipennis (LeConte, 1878)
 Gymnochthebius levis (Deane, 1933)
 Gymnochthebius lividus (Deane, 1933)
 Gymnochthebius lustrosulcus Perkins, 2005
 Gymnochthebius maureenae Perkins, 1980
 Gymnochthebius minipunctus Perkins, 2005
 Gymnochthebius nanosetus Perkins, 2005
 Gymnochthebius nicki Perkins, 2005
 Gymnochthebius nigriceps Perkins, 2005
 Gymnochthebius nitidus (LeConte, 1850)
 Gymnochthebius notalis (Deane, 1933)
 Gymnochthebius octonarius Perkins, 1980
 Gymnochthebius oppositus Perkins, 1980
 Gymnochthebius papua Perkins, 2005
 Gymnochthebius perlabidus Perkins, 1980
 Gymnochthebius perpunctus Perkins, 2005
 Gymnochthebius peruvianus (Balfour-Browne, 1971)
 Gymnochthebius plesiotypus Perkins, 1980
 Gymnochthebius pluvipennis Perkins, 2005
 Gymnochthebius probus Perkins, 2005
 Gymnochthebius radiatus Perkins, 2005
 Gymnochthebius resplendens Perkins, 2005
 Gymnochthebius reticulatissimus Perkins, 1980
 Gymnochthebius reticulatus (Orchymont, 1943)
 Gymnochthebius rhombus Perkins, 2005
 Gymnochthebius semicylindrus Perkins, 2005
 Gymnochthebius seminole Perkins, 1980
 Gymnochthebius setosus Perkins, 2005
 Gymnochthebius sexplanatus Perkins, 2005
 Gymnochthebius squamifer Perkins, 2005
 Gymnochthebius subsulcatus Perkins, 2005
 Gymnochthebius tectus Perkins, 1980
 Gymnochthebius tenebricosus (Deane, 1931)
 Gymnochthebius topali (Balfour-Browne, 1971)
 Gymnochthebius trilineatus Perkins, 2005
 Gymnochthebius truncatus Perkins, 2005
 Gymnochthebius wattsi Perkins, 2005
 Gymnochthebius weiri Perkins, 2005

References

Further reading

 
 

Staphylinoidea
Articles created by Qbugbot